Chambry may refer to:

 Chambry, Aisne, in the Aisne département
 Chambry, Seine-et-Marne, in the Seine-et-Marne département
 Chambry, former name of Chambrey, Moselle